Queen Charlotte Sound / Tōtaranui is the easternmost of the main sounds of the Marlborough Sounds, in New Zealand's South Island.

In 2014, the sound was given the official name of Queen Charlotte Sound / Tōtaranui as part of a Waitangi Tribunal settlement with the Te Āti Awa tribe.

Geography
Like the majority of its neighbours, the sound runs southwest to northeast before joining Cook Strait.

To the east of the sound lie Arapaoa Island and Tory Channel. Interisland ferries use Tory Channel and Queen Charlotte Sound on their journeys between Picton and Wellington in the North Island.

Kenepuru Sound, an arm of Pelorus Sound, lies to the northwest and runs parallel to Queen Charlotte Sound. Some of the small side arms of the two sounds are only hundreds of metres apart, but are separated by a steep serrated range of hills. Not surprisingly, one of the settlements on this stretch of coast is called Portage, named for the simplest method of passing between the two sounds.

The sound is a drowned river valley (or ria).

Towns and settlements
The town of Picton, the northern terminus of the South Island's railway and state highway networks, lies near the head of the sound.

Other settlements are small and isolated—often simply individual properties. Due to the rugged nature of the coast, for many of these access is by boat only.

History
During pre-European and early contact periods, Queen Charlotte Sound was important location for trade between North and South Island Māori, including pakohe (argillite stone) from nearby D'Urville Island, which was used to create toki (adzes).

It was from a hill on Arapaoa Island in 1770 that Captain James Cook first saw the sea passage from the Pacific Ocean to the Tasman Sea, which was named Cook Strait. Captain Cook sheltered in Queen Charlotte Sound during each of his three voyages of exploration at various points, and named it after Queen Consort Charlotte of Mecklenburg-Strelitz.

The area was a base for whaling throughout the 19th and early 20th centuries, notably at Perano Head on Arapaoa Island.

Queen Charlotte Sound has calm water and is popular for sailing - a marked contrast to the notorious waters of Cook Strait. Many ships have been wrecked close to the entrance to the Sound, most notably in recent years the Russian cruise liner Mikhail Lermontov, which sank in 1986 in Port Gore after striking rocks. One life was lost in the incident.

See also
Allports Island
Blumine Island
Motuara Island
Long Island
Mabel Island
Ship Cove (New Zealand), Cook's favourite anchorage in the sound
List of New Zealand places named by James Cook

Notes

References

External links

Queen Charlotte Track at the Department of Conservation
Queen Charlotte Track
Visit Picton

Landforms of the Marlborough Region
Sounds of the Marlborough Sounds
Charlotte of Mecklenburg-Strelitz